Vincent "Vince" Masuka (Masuoka in the books) is a fictional character in the Showtime television series Dexter and the novels by Jeff Lindsay upon which the series is based. On television, he is portrayed by Korean American C. S. Lee. 

The character Masuka is the Miami Metro Police lead forensic science investigator; he works alongside Dexter Morgan in the lab and at crime scenes. He often cracks tasteless and inappropriate jokes, invokes his Japanese heritage only when convenient, and harbors unrequited desire for Dexter's foster sister Debra. Dexter, a serial killer, is concerned that Masuka will uncover his secret.

Character overview
He is portrayed as obsessed with sex — the kinkier the better — and is not shy about propositioning every woman he meets, although he is able to tone it down when the situation calls for it. Detective Joey Quinn once confronts him about his behavior, stating it is the reason that no one likes to be around him. Masuka seems to accept Joey′s explanation when no one comes to see his speech on his newly published work, for which he has cleaned up his act and dressed formally. However, his disappointment at this quickly evaporates when Debra and others defend his assessment of a crime in front of the doubting agents from another enforcement agency by exclaiming that ″Vince Masuka is published″. At Debra's request, he returns to his old self at the end of the episode, although his demeanor appears less vulgar.

One of his saving graces is his sense of personal loyalty to his colleagues. He is greatly distraught after seeing Dexter's wife Rita kiss another man and tries to tell Dexter.

Notable events
Throughout the show, he has terrible luck with new staff and interns. In the sixth season, he guides a group of interns through the labs and brings them to crime scenes. He is attracted to one of his female interns, but ends up firing her when he finds out she stole evidence form the Ice Truck Killer case (a prosthetic forearm and hand) and sold it online. He replaces her with Louis Greene, a tech-savvy game designer who helps Masuka with database analysis. In the seventh season, however, he quickly learns that Louis was the actual buyer of the stolen prosthesis when Dexter mails it back to Miami Metro with a letter of complaint. Masuka fires Louis on the spot.

In the eighth season, he discovers that he has a daughter, Niki, who was the result of a woman using one of his sperm donations. At first, Masuka suspects that Niki is using him for his money, and even has Debra (who has quit Miami Metro and started working as a private detective) look into her past. This was proven false when he learns that she works in a topless sports bar. He gets her a job as a forensics assistant at Miami Metro, allowing them to work together and get to know each other better.

Differences from the novels
In both the television series and the novels, Vince is socially and emotionally awkward. In the novels, Dexter views him as a kindred spirit, believing that Masuka is also "pretending to be human", and asks him to serve as the best man at his wedding. In Dearly Devoted Dexter, Vince throws a large bachelor party for Dexter within a few hours of finding out about his engagement. In the television series, Masuka sets up Dexter's bachelor party and kidnaps him to get him there (where, in the belief that he had been kidnapped by a serial killer called the Skinner, Dexter slugs him in the eye just as he opens the car trunk).

In Dexter in the Dark, Masuka takes his role as best man so seriously that he calls in favors to hire a famous caterer for Dexter's wedding.

References

External links

Dexter (series) characters
Fictional forensic scientists
 Television characters introduced in 2004
 Characters in American novels of the 21st century
 Male characters in television